Patrick John Morrison (born July 15, 1939), better known by his stage name Patrick Wayne, is an American actor. He is the second son of movie star John Wayne and his first wife, Josephine Alicia Saenz. He made over 40 films, including eleven with his father.

Later in his career, Wayne became a television host with the 1980 variety program The Monte Carlo Show and the 1990 revival of Tic-Tac-Dough.

Early life and career 
Born in Los Angeles, he is one of John Wayne's four children by his first wife, Josephine Alicia Saenz, daughter of Panama's Consul General to the U.S. He adopted his father's stage surname, Wayne. He made eleven movies with his father: Rio Grande (1950), The Quiet Man (1952), The High and the Mighty (1954) - as a props assistant, The Conqueror (1956), The Searchers (1956), The Alamo (1960), The Comancheros (1961), Donovan's Reef (1963), McLintock! (1963), The Green Berets (1968) and Big Jake (1971).

Patrick made his film debut at age 11 in his father's film Rio Grande. He followed that with films directed by John Ford: The Quiet Man (1952), The Sun Shines Bright (1953), The Long Gray Line (1955), Mister Roberts (1955) and The Searchers (1956).

Other television work included the baseball teleplay Rookie of the Year (1955), directed by John Ford and starring John Wayne, and Flashing Spikes (1962), a baseball television anthology installment directed by Ford and starring James Stewart, with John Wayne in an extended cameo role. Patrick Wayne played similar roles in both shows as baseball players.

Following high school, Patrick attended Loyola Marymount University, where he was a member of Alpha Delta Gamma fraternity; he graduated in 1961. During this time, he struck out on his own to star in his own film The Young Land (1959). He supported his father in The Alamo, Donovan's Reef, McLintock! and The Green Berets. He also appeared in Ford's sprawling epic Cheyenne Autumn (1964), as James Stewart's son in Shenandoah (1965), in An Eye for an Eye (1966), The Deserter (1971), and in a lead role in The Bears and I for Walt Disney (1974). Patrick also served a tour of duty with the United States Coast Guard from 1961 to 1965.

Later works 
Following work on his father's 1971 film Big Jake, Wayne earned recognition in the sci-fi genre. His career peaked in the late 1970s in the popular matinee fantasy Sinbad and the Eye of the Tiger (1977), then in The People That Time Forgot (1977). Wayne also screen-tested for the title role of Superman.  He co-starred as a romantic love interest to Shirley Jones in the brief TV series Shirley (1979). He was the host of The Monte Carlo Show in 1980 and occasionally worked on game shows and syndicated variety series.

Wayne had many appearances on popular television series of the 1970s and 1980s, including Fantasy Island (1978), Murder, She Wrote (1984), Charlie's Angels (1976), Sledge Hammer! (1986), and The Love Boat. Wayne appeared in the movie Young Guns (1988) as Pat Garrett. He also did a comic turn in the Western spoof Rustler's Rhapsody (1985).

Wayne served as the host of the 1990 revival of the game show Tic-Tac-Dough.

In 2003, Wayne became chairman of the John Wayne Cancer Institute.

In December 2015, Wayne travelled to Spain to receive the prize Almeria Tierra de Cine in Almeria, Andalucia for his long career in the cinema, and in his acceptance speech he noted that his maternal grandparents were born in Madrid and that he is half Spanish.

Personal life
Wayne is retired from acting and lives in Arizona.

Filmography

Rio Grande (1950) - Boy (uncredited)
The Quiet Man (1952) - Boy on Wagon at Horse Race (uncredited)
The Sun Shines Bright (1953) - Cadet (un-credited)
The Long Grey Line (1955) - Abner 'Cherub' Overton
Mister Roberts (1955) - Bookser
The Conqueror (1956) - (uncredited)
The Searchers (1956) - Lt. Greenhill
The Young Land (1959) - Sheriff Jim Ellison
The Alamo (1960) - Captain James Butler Bonham
The Comancheros (1961) - Tobe (credited as Pat Wayne)
Donovan's Reef (1963) - Australian Navy Lt. (uncredited)
McLintock! (1963) - Devlin Warren
Cheyenne Autumn (1964) - 2nd Lt. Scott
Shenandoah (1965) - James Anderson
An Eye for an Eye (1966) - Benny Wallace
The Green Berets (1968) - LT Jamison, CEC, USN
Sole Survivor (1970, TV Movie) - Mac
Swing Out, Sweet Land (1970, TV Movie) - James Caldwell (uncredited)
The Deserter (1971) - Captain Bill Robinson
The Gatling Gun (1971) - Jim Boland
Big Jake (1971) - James McCandles
Movin' On (1972, TV Movie) - Client Daniels
Beyond Atlantis (1973) - Vic Mathias
The Bears and I (1974) - Bob Leslie
The New Spartans (1975) - Bigdick McCracken
Mustang Country (1976) - Tee Jay
Yesterday's Child (1977, TV Movie) - Sanford Grant
Flight to Holocaust (1977, TV Movie) - Les Taggart
The People That Time Forgot (1977) - Ben McPride
Sinbad and the Eye of the Tiger (1977) - Sinbad
The Last Hurrah (1977, TV Movie) - Robert "Bobby" Skeffington
Three on a Date (1978, TV Movie) - Roger Powell
Texas Detour (1978) - Clay McCarthy
Rustlers' Rhapsody (1985) - Bob Barber
Revenge (1986) - Michael Hogan
Young Guns (1988) - Patrick Floyd "Pat" Garrett
Chill Factor (1989) - Jerry Rivers
Her Alibi (1989) - Gary Blackwood
Deep Cover (1997) - Ray

Television

Screen Directors Playhouse - Rookie of the Year - Lyn Goodhue (1955)
Mr. Adams and Eve - Walter (1958)
"Teenage Idol" (1958, unsold sitcom pilot)
Have Gun - Will Travel, episode "Black Sheep" (1960)
Alcoa Premiere: Bill Riley (1962)
Branded, episode "The Mission: Part 3": Corporal Dewey (1965)
Voyage to the Bottom of the Sea, episode "Killers of the Deep" (1966)
12 O'Clock High, episode "The Outsider": Lt. Gabriel (1966)
The Rounders, 17 episodes: Howdy Lewis (1966-1967)
The F.B.I., episode "The Widow": Fred Bruno (1968)
Love, American Style, episode "Love and Grandma": Oliver (1970)
McCloud, episode "The Colorado Cattle Caper": Deputy Morris Knowles (1974)
Marcus Welby, M.D., episode "The Outrage": Sgt. Buchanan (1974)
Police Woman, episode "It's Only a Game": Kevin Duffy (1974)
Walt Disney's Wonderful World of Color, episode "The Bears and I: Part 2": Bob Leslie (1976)
The Life and Times of Grizzly Adams, episode "The Renewal" (1978)
The Love Boat - 7 episodes - Various (1979-1986)
The Monte Carlo Show - Host/Himself (1980)
Shirley, episodes: Lew Armitage (1980)
Charlie's Angels, episode "Waikiki Angels": Steve Walters (1981)
Fantasy Island, episode "Hard Knocks/Lady Godiva": John Apensdale (1981)
Fantasy Island, episode "The Big Bet/Nancy and the Thunderbirds" (1982)
Lottery!, episode "Kansas City: Protected Winner" (1983)
Fantasy Island, episode "Midnight Waltz": François (1983)
Murder, She Wrote, episode "Murder, She Spoke": Randy Witworth (1987)
Sledge Hammer!, episode "Brother, Can You Spare a Crime?": Myles (1987)
Danger Bay, episode "All the King's Horses": Mr. Cormier (1987)
MacGyver, episode "Collision Course": Jeff Stone (1988)
Out of This World, episode "Old Flame": Robby Jamison (1988)
Frank's Place, episode "Frank's Place: The Movie": Brandman Carr (1988)
Alfred Hitchcock Presents, episode "South By Southeast": Michael Roberts (1989)
Tic-Tac-Dough - Host/Himself (September–December 1990)
They Came from Outer Space, episode "Look Who's Barking": Lester Kerwick (1991)
Kung Fu: The Legend Continues, episode "Manhunt": Garrison (1995)
High Tide, episode "Two Barretts and a Baby" (1997)
Silk Stalkings, episode "Pumped Up": Harmon Lange (1997)

Documentaries/DVD special features
Hollywood Greats, episode "John Wayne": himself (1984)
A Turning of the Earth: John Ford, John Wayne and the Searchers (1998)
The Quiet Man: The Joy of Ireland" himself (2002)
50 Films to See Before You Die, TV movie documentary: himself (2006)
American Masters, episode "John Ford/John Wayne: The Filmmaker and the Legend": himself (2006)
100 Years of John Wayne, TV movie documentary short: himself (2007)
The Personal Property of John Wayne, video documentary (2011)

References

External links 

 

1939 births
Living people
American male film actors
American game show hosts
Male actors from Los Angeles
Male Western (genre) film actors
American people of Panamanian descent
New Star of the Year (Actor) Golden Globe winners